Donald Zackary Greinke (born October 21, 1983) is an American professional baseball pitcher for the Kansas City Royals of Major League Baseball (MLB). He made his MLB debut with the Royals in 2004 and has also played in MLB for the Milwaukee Brewers, Los Angeles Angels of Anaheim, Los Angeles Dodgers, Arizona Diamondbacks, and Houston Astros.

The Royals selected Greinke in the first round with the 6th pick of the 2002 MLB draft, after he won the Gatorade National Player of the Year Award as a high school senior. After playing in the minor leagues, he made his MLB debut in 2004. His career was nearly derailed by his battles with depression and anxiety in 2005 and 2006, and he missed most of the 2006 season. He returned in 2007 as a relief pitcher, before rejoining the starting rotation in 2008 and developing into one of the top pitchers in the game. In 2009, he appeared in the MLB All-Star Game, led the major leagues in earned run average, and won the American League Cy Young Award.

A dedicated competitor often described as unique in his talent and demeanor by teammates, Greinke is a six-time All-Star and six-time Gold Glove Award winner.

Early life
Greinke was born in Orlando, Florida, the son of teachers Donald and Marsha Greinke. He is of German descent, and was active in Little League and also excelled in tennis and golf tournaments as a youth. As a teenager, Greinke helped lead his team to the Senior League World Series title in 1999. He played shortstop for the team, and his coach estimated that he hit close to .700 in the tournament.

Greinke was primarily a shortstop when he started playing baseball at Apopka High School. He hit over .400 with 31 home runs in his high school career. He worked as a relief pitcher as a sophomore and junior, before becoming a starting pitcher as a senior. During his senior season, in 2002, Greinke compiled a 9–2 win–loss record, a 0.55 earned run average (ERA), and 118 strikeouts in 63 innings. He also held opposing batters to a .107 average. He led his team to a 32–2 record and their third straight district title, and was selected as Gatorade National Player of the Year. After the high school season ended, he played in the Florida Athletic Coaches Association All-Star Classic and impressed pro scouts with his performance against some of the best hitters in the country.

Professional career

Draft and minor leagues
The Kansas City Royals selected Greinke in the first round, with the sixth overall selection, of the 2002 Major League Baseball draft. They felt Greinke was a polished player who could move quickly through their system. Greinke turned down a scholarship offer from Clemson University to sign with the Royals for a $2.5 million signing bonus.

Greinke pitched in six minor league games for the Royals farm teams in 2002: three games for the Gulf Coast Royals, two for the Low-A Spokane Indians, and two innings for the High-A Wilmington Blue Rocks of the Carolina League. He had a 3.97 ERA in  innings.

In 2003, Greinke opened the season with Wilmington, where he was 11–1 with a 1.14 ERA in 14 starts. Those numbers earned spots on the Carolina League mid-season and post-season all-star teams as well as Carolina League Pitcher of the Year award. The Blue Rocks' manager, Billy Gardner, Jr., remarked that Greinke was "the best pitcher I've ever seen at this level of the minor leagues."
He was promoted in July to the AA Wichita Wranglers of the Texas League, where in nine starts he was 4–3 with a 3.23 ERA. He had a couple of games where he struggled at Wichita and gave up a lot of runs. However, he bounced back and helped them make the playoffs with a victory in the final game of the season.

Greinke was named the organization's Minor League Pitcher of the Year for 2003. He was promoted by the Royals in 2004 to the Omaha Royals of the Pacific Coast League, where he was 1–1 with a 2.51 ERA in six starts.

Kansas City Royals (2004–2010)
Greinke was called up to the major leagues on May 22, 2004, and made his major league debut against the Oakland Athletics, allowing two runs in five innings. At 20 years old he was the youngest player in the majors and came close to picking up the win, but the team's closer, Jeremy Affeldt, gave up the lead with two outs in the bottom of the ninth inning.

Greinke recorded his first career win on June 8, when he pitched seven scoreless innings against the Montreal Expos. In 24 starts, Greinke finished the 2004 year with an 8–11 record and a 3.97 ERA.

His first major league hit was a home run off Arizona Diamondbacks pitcher Russ Ortiz in a 12–10 loss on June 10, 2005; however, he also allowed 15 hits in that game, which tied a club record. In 2005, Greinke led the American League in losses, finishing with a 5–17 record and a 5.80 ERA in 33 starts.

Greinke was sometimes quiet and awkward in the clubhouse. To alleviate some of his anxiety and solitude, the Royals made arrangements for him to live with Royals Hall of Fame third baseman George Brett. Still, by the 2005–2006 off-season he nearly quit baseball; Greinke later remarked that, at the time, he did not expect to return. He left spring training for personal reasons in late February 2006. It was later revealed that he was diagnosed with depression and a social anxiety disorder. He reported back to the Royals' spring training facility in Surprise, Arizona, on April 17, where he underwent ongoing pitching sessions. He was placed on the 60-day disabled list due to psychological issues and took time away from baseball entirely. He began seeing a sports psychologist and taking anti-depressant medication. Greinke only made three appearances out of the bullpen in 2006, and finished the year 1–0 with a 4.26 ERA.

In 2007, Greinke returned to the Royals rotation at the start of the season, but was assigned to the bullpen in early May. In 52 appearances (14 starts), Greinke finished 2007 with a 7–7 record and a 3.69 ERA.

Greinke returned to the rotation in 2008 and performed well that season. He made 32 starts in 2008 and finished with a 13–10 record along with 183 strikeouts. His 3.47 ERA was the best by a full-time Royals starter in 11 years. On January 26, 2009, he agreed to a four-year contract with the Royals worth $38 million.

After ending the 2008 season with 15 scoreless innings, Greinke started off 2009 by not allowing a run in his first 24 innings, which meant that for 39 innings in a row, he had not given up a run. Greinke was named American League (AL) Pitcher of the Month for April, his five wins, 0.50 ERA and 44 strikeouts all tops in the Majors. On August 25, Greinke struck out 15 batters, breaking Mark Gubicza's team record for strikeouts in a single game. On August 30, Greinke had a one-hit complete game against the Seattle Mariners.

Greinke's record for the 2009 season was 16–8, and he posted an ERA of 2.16, the lowest in MLB. On October 21, he was named American League Pitcher of the Year by Sporting News. On October 28, Greinke was awarded the MLBPA Players Choice AL Pitcher of the Year. On November 17, 2009, he won the AL Cy Young Award. Greinke credited some of his performance to his use of "modern pitching metrics" — statistics on team defense and defense independent pitching statistics — to calibrate his own approach to pitching. Greinke specifically mentioned FIP (fielding independent pitching), an indicator developed by sabermetrician Tom Tango, as his favorite statistic. "That's pretty much how I pitch, to try to keep my FIP as low as possible.

Despite a stellar 2009 season, his performance in 2010 began to regress as he finished the year 10–14 with a 4.17 ERA and 181 strikeouts.

Milwaukee Brewers (2011–2012)
On December 17, 2010, Greinke reportedly asked the Royals to trade him, claiming that he was not motivated to play for a rebuilding team. The Royals were unlikely to afford signing Greinke to a long-term deal once he became a free agent, so they agreed to trade him for some quality prospects. On December 19, he was traded to the Milwaukee Brewers with Yuniesky Betancourt and $2 million for Alcides Escobar, Lorenzo Cain, Jeremy Jeffress, and Jake Odorizzi. He was given the number 13, instead of his preferred number 23, due to number 23 already being issued to Rickie Weeks. Greinke would later admit that he handled the trade request poorly, saying that he was "pretty rude" on the way out, but the deal worked out well for both teams.

In February 2011, before reporting to his first spring training with the Brewers, Greinke suffered a fractured rib while playing basketball. He started the 2011 season on the disabled list.

Greinke made his Brewers debut in the second game of a doubleheader on May 4, 2011. Despite missing the first month of the season because of his injury, Greinke finished second on the team in wins with a 16–6 record. He also had a 3.83 ERA, and 201 strikeouts (seventh in the National League (NL)) in 171 innings pitched while surrendering just 45 walks. Greinke became only the fifth Brewer pitcher to strike out 200+ batters in a season. He was fourth in the NL in won-lost percentage (.727) and sixth in wins. He went a perfect 11–0 in his starts at Miller Park, the Brewers' home stadium. Overall, Grienke finished the 2011 year with a 16–6 record, a 3.83 ERA, and 201 strikeouts in 28 starts.

On April 7, 2012, the Brewers defeated the Cardinals 6–0 in Greinke's first start of the season after he pitched seven scoreless innings while giving up four hits and striking out seven.

In an oddity, Greinke became the first pitcher to start three straight games in the Majors in 95 years. On July 7, he was ejected from the game after just four pitches for angrily throwing the ball into the ground following a close play at first base. The following day, Greinke started again, but lasted only until the third inning. The All-Star break followed, and Greinke was the Brewers' starter on July 13, the team's next game. Greinke's third start ended after five innings. Before this, the most recent pitcher to start three consecutive games was Red Faber in 1917, who started both games of a September 3 doubleheader, throwing just six innings in total, followed by a complete game win the following day.

To begin 2012, Greinke made 21 starts with the Brewers and had a 9–3 record, 120 strikeouts, and a 3.44 ERA.

Los Angeles Angels of Anaheim (2012)
Despite his success with the Brewers, the team was struggling and not likely to make a playoff run. When talks on a contract extension broke down, the team traded Greinke to the Los Angeles Angels of Anaheim on July 27, 2012, in exchange for top infield prospect Jean Segura and pitchers Ariel Peña and Johnny Hellweg. Brewers General Manager Doug Melvin remarked that it was one of the tougher decisions he had to make because he was fond of Greinke.

Greinke made his first start for the Angels on July 29. After a stretch of four unproductive starts from August 3–19 (1–1, 7.20 ERA in 25 innings), Greinke followed up with four consecutive starts of at least seven innings and two or fewer runs — all of them wins. In those starts, he produced a 1.88 ERA in  innings.

Greinke became the first pitcher since 1920 to record 13 strikeouts in five innings or less in a game against the Seattle Mariners on September 25. He then combined with four other Angels pitchers to tie an American League record by striking out 20 batters in a nine-inning game. He finished his time with the Angels with a 6–2 record and a 3.53 ERA in 13 starts. Overall in 2012, combined with both teams, Greinke made 34 starts with a 15–5 record, 200 strikeouts, and a 3.48 ERA.

Los Angeles Dodgers (2013–2015)
Greinke agreed to a six-year free agent contract with the Los Angeles Dodgers worth $147 million, on December 8, 2012. The deal, which was finalized on December 10, was the largest ever for a right-handed pitcher at the time it was signed. It was surpassed a year later by Félix Hernández's seven-year, $175 million contract extension with the Seattle Mariners. Greinke later claimed that he chose the Dodgers over the Texas Rangers, who also were pursuing him, primarily because they offered more money.

On April 11, 2013, Greinke fractured his left collarbone in a brawl with Carlos Quentin of the San Diego Padres after Quentin was hit by an inside pitch and charged the mound. He was placed on the disabled list and it was revealed that he would require surgery, which was performed on April 13. It was estimated that he would miss eight weeks of the season. However, he returned to action on May 10 when he pitched in a rehab game for the Class-A Rancho Cucamonga Quakes. He returned to the Dodgers on May 15.

On June 11, 2013, Greinke was hit in the head and neck area by Arizona Diamondbacks pitcher Ian Kennedy, leading to a bench-clearing brawl. Because Greinke did not participate in the brawl, he was unaffected.

Greinke picked up his 100th career win on August 5, 2013, against the St. Louis Cardinals. He was 5–0 with a 1.23 ERA during the month of August and was selected as National League Pitcher of the Month. Greinke finished his first season with the Dodgers with a 15–4 record and 2.63 ERA in 28 starts. He also batted .328, the highest batting average for a Dodgers pitcher since Orel Hershiser in the 1993 season. He was awarded with the Silver Slugger Award as the best hitting pitcher in the National League.

Greinke began the 2014 season by setting an MLB record with 22 straight starts (dating back to July 2013) where he allowed two or fewer earned runs. He was selected to the National League squad at the 2014 Major League Baseball All-Star Game and finished the season with a 17–8 record and a 2.71 ERA in 32 starts, the highest win total in his career. He won the Gold Glove Award as the best fielding pitcher in the National League.

When Justin Upton of the San Diego Padres homered against Greinke in the eighth inning on June 13, 2015, it was the last run he surrendered until the All-Star break. Greinke was then selected to the All-Star Game, his second straight appearance, and chosen to be the starting pitcher for the National League squad. At that point in the season, Greinke carried a major league-leading 1.48 ERA with a 7–2 record and  consecutive scoreless innings. After Greinke retired 28 consecutive batters over a span of two starts, Nationals outfielder Michael Taylor ended the streak in the third inning on July 19. His scoreless inning streak lasted until a July 26 start against the New York Mets at Citi Field. He shared the NL Player of the Week honors with his teammate Clayton Kershaw for July 13–19. Greinke finished the 2015 season with a 19–3 record, 200 strikeouts, and a major-league-best 1.66 ERA. His ERA was the second-lowest in Dodgers history behind Rube Marquard in 1916, and his ERA+ (225) and major-league-leading WHIP (0.844) were the best in franchise history. He led all major league pitchers in left on base percentage, stranding 86.5% of base runners.

Greinke pitched in two games in the 2015 National League Division Series against the New York Mets. He allowed five runs in  innings and took the loss in the deciding fifth game in the series. At the conclusion of the series, it was announced that he would opt out of the last three years of his contract with the Dodgers and become a free agent. He officially opted out on November 3.

After the season, Greinke was selected as the Outstanding National League Pitcher at the Players Choice Awards, and won his second Gold Glove Award. Greinke finished second in the NL Cy Young Award voting to Jake Arrieta.

Arizona Diamondbacks (2016–2019)
On December 8, 2015, Greinke signed a six-year, $206.5 million contract with the Arizona Diamondbacks. Greinke started on Opening Day 2016 at Chase Field against the Colorado Rockies; he gave up seven runs in four innings, including two home runs to rookie shortstop Trevor Story, who was making his MLB debut. The Diamondbacks lost the game 10–5. In his second start, on April 9, Greinke matched up against Kyle Hendricks and the Chicago Cubs. He allowed three runs in the first inning, and struggled through the rest of his outing. The Diamondbacks lost the game 4–2. Greinke got his first win as a Diamondback on April 19, 2016, against the San Francisco Giants, allowing just one run in over six innings of work. On July 3, 2016, Greinke was placed on the 15-day disabled list due to a left oblique strain. On August 24, 2016, he recorded his 2000th career strikeout in the Diamondbacks' 10–9 win over Atlanta Braves. Greinke finished his first year 13–7, but with a 4.37 ERA in  innings.

In 2017, Greinke was selected to the NL All-Star team, his fourth All-Star selection. At the time of his selection he was 10–4 with a 3.05 ERA in  innings, 128 strikeouts (10.21 strikeouts per nine innings), WHIP of 1.02 and a .219 opponents batting average. On September 16 versus the San Francisco Giants at AT&T Park, he completed eight shutout innings with two hits allowed and eight strikeouts as Arizona won, 2−0. His game score of 90 was the second-best of his career, and he also hit two doubles at the plate. In 32 starts in 2017, Greinke finished with a 17–7 record, 215 strikeouts, and a 3.20 ERA in  innings. The Diamondbacks finished with a 93–69 record and clinched a Wild Card spot, but lost to the Dodgers in the Division Series. Greinke won his fourth consecutive Rawlings Gold Glove Award after the 2017 season. He also finished fourth in the Cy Young voting behind Max Scherzer, Clayton Kershaw and Stephen Strasburg.

Greinke was once again named an All-Star in 2018. He finished the season with a 15–11 record and a 3.21 ERA in 33 starts. Following the season, he won his fifth consecutive Gold Glove Award.

On April 2, 2019, Greinke hit two home runs and struck out 10 as the Diamondbacks won 8–5 against the Padres. In 2019 with Arizona before he was traded, he was 10–4 with a 2.90 ERA.

Greinke batted .271 with three home runs and eight RBIs with the Diamondbacks in 2019, earning him his second career Silver Slugger Award.

Houston Astros (2019–2021)
On July 31, 2019, the Diamondbacks traded Greinke to the Houston Astros with cash considerations in exchange for four minor league prospects: Corbin Martin, J. B. Bukauskas, Seth Beer, and Joshua Rojas. The Diamondbacks also agreed to pay $24 million of Greinke's remaining $77 million salary.

In 2019 with the Astros he was 8–1 with a 3.02 ERA. Between the two teams, in 2019 he was 18–5 with a 2.93 ERA, as in 208.2 innings (sixth in the majors) over 33 starts he walked only 30 batters (1.3 walks per nine innings, the best ratio of his career and third-best in the major leagues), and had a WHIP of 0.982 (fifth-best in the major leagues). At the plate, he batted .280/.308/.580 with three home runs and eight RBIs in 50 at bats. Greinke started Games 3 and 7 of the 2019 World Series for Houston. Greinke allowed two runs on two hits in  innings in his Game 7 start. He was pulled by manager A. J. Hinch in the seventh inning after surrendering a one-out home run to Anthony Rendon, followed by a walk to Juan Soto, with the Astros leading 2–1. He was replaced by Will Harris, who allowed a 2-run home run to Howie Kendrick. The Astros ultimately lost the game 6–2, prompting questions afterward by members of the media about the timing of Hinch's decision to pull Greinke.

In 2020, Greinke produced a 3–3 record with a 4.03 ERA in 12 starts spanning 67 innings, and was second in the AL in walks per nine innings (1.209) and fourth in home runs per nine innings (0.806).

On April 1, 2021, Greinke earned his first career Opening Day win, and 209th win overall, as the Astros defeated the Oakland Athletics, 8–1, at the Oakland Coliseum. He pitched six scoreless innings, the 65th time his career he has produced at least six scoreless innings. In the May 25 contest versus the Los Angeles Dodgers, he reached 3,000 career innings, the 135th pitcher in major league history to achieve this milestone. On June 4, 2021, Greinke threw a complete game for the first time since April 19, 2017. He allowed six hits with one run and one walk and three strikeouts in a 13–1 win over the Toronto Blue Jays at Sahlen Field in Buffalo, New York.

In 2021, Greinke was credited with an 11–6 W–L record and 4.16 ERA over 30 games and 29 starts. He ranked second in the AL in walks per nine innings (1.895) and fifth in WHIP (1.170) and home runs (30). In the World Series versus the Atlanta Braves, Greinke started Game 4, recording four scoreless innings. At the plate, he singled in the second inning to become the first Astros pitcher to get a hit in World Series play. On November 3, 2021, Greinke was declared a free agent.

Return to Kansas City Royals (2022–present)
Greinke expressed an interest to possibly finish his career with the Royals, saying as such to George Brett during the 2021-22 lockout. On March 16, 2022, Greinke signed a one-year, $13 million contract to return to the Royals. On March 31, Greinke was announced as the Royals' Opening Day Starter, the first time he'd been given the role for the Royals since 2010, marking the largest gap between Opening Day pitching starts for the same team. He made his 500th career start on June 29 versus the Texas Rangers, going six innings in a 2−1 win.

Greinke re-signed with the Royals on a one year contract worth $8.5 million on February 3, 2023.

Pitching style 

Greinke throws six different pitches:
 Four-seam fastball — 
 Two-seam fastball — 
 Cutter — 
 Slider — 
 Curveball — 
 Changeup — 

His curveball has two speeds with different types of movement, and he will sometimes throw a curve that is more in the middle range combining the types of movement. His two-seamer is his most-used pitch against right-handed hitters and is used more frequently than against lefties, as is his slider. His changeup is thrown only to left-handed hitters. Greinke's curveball is typically used early in the count, while his slider is his most common 2-strike pitch.

Greinke's slider has been one of his more effective pitches. Hitters have only a .154 batting average and .230 slugging percentage against the pitch. It has produced 51% of his strikeouts. Its whiff rate is 42%, and more than half the pitches put in play are ground balls. However, he limits the use of the slider in order not to put excessive strain on his arm.

Greinke has produced good strikeout-to-walk ratios throughout his career, finishing in his league's top 10 five times and ranking eighth among active pitchers in the category, at 3.76:1 as of the end of the 2017 regular season.

Greinke has been described as a "scientist as a pitcher" and is known for preparing for each start more extensively than most.

Owing to his upright overhand pitching style, with a pause where the ball is hidden down next to his right knee before release, a forward-facing follow-through, and late movement that reaches the lower third of the strike zone, he is in an excellent position for fielding soft, short hits coming at him, which helped him gain many assists and six consecutive NL Gold Glove Awards as a pitcher. He was still awarded NL Gold Glove in 2019 because he started the 2019 season in Arizona before being traded.

Batting 
Greinke is a good hitting pitcher, having won two Silver Slugger Awards in his career with a .225 batting average. He has also amassed nine stolen bases over his career (on ten stolen base attempts), and he has expressed a desire to end his career with ten home runs and ten stolen bases; he has nine of each, with his last home run and stolen base each being in 2019. In his fourth at-bat as a major leaguer, Greinke hit his first home run. Years later, when teammate Alex Gordon was in a slump, Greinke had the idea to take him into the video room and show the clip of his home run multiple times before leaving by saying, "Do more of that."

Personal life 
Greinke is married to Emily Kuchar, whom he met while attending Apopka High School. Kuchar is a former Dallas Cowboys Cheerleader and was Miss Daytona Beach USA 2008. Their sons were born in 2015, 2017, and 2021. They reside in Orlando, Florida.

Greinke's younger brother, Luke, was also a pitcher who played college baseball at Auburn University. Luke was drafted by the New York Yankees in the 12th round of the 2008 MLB draft, but was out of baseball a year later because of injuries.

See also 

 Houston Astros award winners and league leaders
 Kansas City Royals award winners and league leaders
 List of Los Angeles Dodgers team records
 List of Major League Baseball annual ERA leaders
 List of Major League Baseball career games started leaders
 List of Major League Baseball career putouts as a pitcher leaders
 List of Major League Baseball career strikeout leaders
 List of Major League Baseball career WHIP leaders
 List of Major League Baseball career Wins Above Replacement leaders
 List of Major League Baseball career wins leaders
 List of Major League Baseball single-inning strikeout leaders
 List of people from Orlando, Florida
 List of World Series starting pitchers
 Los Angeles Dodgers award winners and league leaders

References

External links 

1983 births
American League All-Stars
American League ERA champions
American people of German descent
Arizona Diamondbacks players
Baseball players from Orlando, Florida
Brevard County Manatees players
Cy Young Award winners
Gold Glove Award winners
Gulf Coast Royals players
Houston Astros players
Kansas City Royals players
Living people
Los Angeles Angels players
Los Angeles Dodgers players
Major League Baseball pitchers
Milwaukee Brewers players
Nashville Sounds players
National League All-Stars
National League ERA champions
Omaha Royals players
Rancho Cucamonga Quakes players
Reno Aces players
Silver Slugger Award winners
Spokane Indians players
Sugar Land Skeeters players
Wichita Wranglers players
Wilmington Blue Rocks players